I Represent is the first album by American rapper Camoflauge. Following this album's release, Camoflauge went on to produce two more albums before his early death.

Track listing
 GA (Intro)(Prod. by G. Cope)
 Weeded Out Lyrics (Prod. by Fat Boy)
 Bring Da Pain (Feat. G. Datts) Prod. by G. Cope)
 I Represent (Prod. by G. Cope)
 Head Bustin (Prod. by Dushawn)
 Like You Badd (Feat. L.Douglass, N.Holsey, D.Lockhart)(Prod. by Fat Boy)
 Let's Get 'Em (Feat. M.Harris)
 Let's Ride
 17 Shots
 Do What I Gotta
 No Love
 Things Gonna Get Better
 Playa
 From Da South
 Love Da Way You Do Dat
 Y'all Don't Want No Drama
 Nigga What
 Da Click

External links

2000 albums